Elan Nichele Daley (born 27 February 2005) is a Bermudian swimmer. She represented Bermuda at the 2019 World Aquatics Championships held in Gwangju, South Korea. She competed in the women's 100 metre freestyle and women's 200 metre freestyle events. In both events she did not advance to compete in the semi-finals.

References

2005 births
Living people
Bermudian female swimmers
Place of birth missing (living people)